Starorussky (masculine), Starorusskaya (feminine), or Starorusskoye (neuter) is the name of several rural localities in Russia:
Starorusskoye, Kaliningrad Oblast, a settlement in Khrabrovsky Rural Okrug of Guryevsky District of Kaliningrad Oblast
Starorusskoye, Leningrad Oblast, a logging depot settlement in Polyanskoye Settlement Municipal Formation of Vyborgsky District of Leningrad Oblast
Starorusskoye, Sakhalin Oblast, a selo under the administrative jurisdiction of the city of oblast significance of Yuzhno-Sakhalinsk, Sakhalin Oblast